Barrett-Faulkner House is a historic home located near Peachland, Anson County, North Carolina.  It dates to the early-19th century and was remodeled in 1847 in the Greek Revival style. The house is a -story, dogtrot plan frame dwelling, five bays wide, with a single-pile main block.

It was listed on the National Register of Historic Places in 2012.

References

Houses on the National Register of Historic Places in North Carolina
Greek Revival houses in North Carolina
Houses completed in 1847
Houses in Anson County, North Carolina
National Register of Historic Places in Anson County, North Carolina
1847 establishments in North Carolina